The fluffy (fl) gene of Neurospora crassa is required for asexual sporulation and encodes an 88 kDa polypeptide containing a typical fungal Zn2Cys6 DNA-binding motif.

References 

Transcription factors